Critodemus was a Greek astrologer. "One of the earliest known authors on astrology", he was used as a source by Pliny and Vettius Valens among others. His dates are uncertain but 1st century AD at the latest.

References

Ancient Greek astrologers
Year of birth unknown
Year of death unknown